The Church Pastoral Aid Society (CPAS) is an Anglican evangelical mission agency. It was founded in 1836.

History of the Society

The CPAS was founded in 1836 in the midst of the social upheaval of the Industrial Revolution to take 'the gospel to every man's door, with a single eye to the glory of God'. Its founders included the prominent social reformer Lord Shaftesbury.

It initially sought to fulfil its vision by giving grants to poorest parishes to enable them to take on extra help. One early recipient of such a grant was Haworth, which enabled its minister, Patrick Brontë, to employ a curate, Arthur Nicholls, who later married Patrick's daughter, Charlotte. Charlotte summarised and praised the early work of the CPAS in the opening of her 1846 novel Shirley:

"Of late years, I say, an abundant shower of curates has fallen upon the north of England, but in eighteen-hundred-eleven-twelve that affluent rain had not descended. Curates were scarce then: there was no Pastoral Aid - no Additional Curates' Society to stretch a helping hand to worn-out old rectors and incumbents, and give them the wherewithal to pay a vigorous young colleague from Oxford or Cambridge."

While the CPAS has since diversified in its methods, which now notably include its holidays for young people, it retains its original vision of "enabl[ing] churches to help every person hear and discover the good news of Jesus Christ."

Work of the Society
The CPAS works with churches across Ireland and the United Kingdom. Its aim is to "enable churches to help every person hear and discover the good news of Jesus". Its activities include the Growing Leaders suite of resources, the  Arrow Leadership Programme, weekends, and a range of events and resources for youth and children's leaders.

CPAS is responsible for Venture and Falcon holidays, which are holidays for 8-18s. Falcons are subsidised holidays for young people who might not otherwise be able to go on holiday. CPAS also has responsibility (sole or shared) for around 690 patronages of Anglican churches up and down the country, and seeks to fill vacant incumbency posts with evangelical leaders.

There is a head office team who develop and deliver tools, training and resources for churches.

Their records are held at the University of Birmingham Special Collections.

Controversy
In March 2021, Church Times reported a conflict in 2018 between CPAS and the PCC of St Luke's, West Holloway (a member of Inclusive Church), over the appointment of a new vicar. The PCC representatives could not agree with the patron on which candidates to shortlist, after two rounds of interviews. After a year elapsed, CPAS' right of presentation expired, and eventually the new vicar, John MacKenzie, was appointed by Sarah Mullally, Bishop of London. Joanne Grenfell, Bishop of Stepney, is working to resolve the situation by trying to finding another parish with which to do a patronage swap. Neither John Dunnett, CPAS general director, nor Mike Duff, CPAS patronage secretary, commented to Church Times.

Writing about the system of patronage, Martin Wroe suggested it is "time to disempower some of these hidden hierarchies and place a little more trust in the local".

Notes

External links

 

Anglican organizations
Christian charities based in the United Kingdom
Christian missions
Church of England societies and organisations
Church of England missionary societies
Organisations based in Coventry
Religion in Warwickshire
University of Warwick
1836 establishments in the United Kingdom